An incomplete list of schools in Ghent.

G
Ghent
De Letterdoos
Atheneum Wispelberg
Basisschool De Mozaiek
Basisschool Frans van Ryhove
Basisschool Het Klaverblad
Bibliotheekschool
Bollekensschool
BSGO Oefenschool Gent
BuSO Sint-Gerardus
CBE
Crombeeninstituut
De Harp
De Kolibrie
De La Sallecollege Gent-Centrum
De Loods
De Panda
De Vlieger
De Wijze Boom Sint-Amandsberg
De Wingerd
EDUGO Scholengemeenschap
Gaspard de Colignyschool
Handelsschool Coupure
Het Trappenhuis
Hogeschool Gent
Industrieel Ingenieur BME-CTL
Instituut Bert Carlier
Instituut van Gent
International School Ghent
Katholieke Hogeschool voor Lerarenopleiding en Bedrijfsmanagement
Koninklijk Atheneum Gent
Kunstsecundair Instituut Sint-Lucas Gent
Methodeschool De Appelaar
MSGO III Gent
Nieuwen Bosch
Nieuwen Bosch Basisschool
Onze Lieve Vrouw Instituut
Provinciaal Centrum voor Volwassenenonderwijs
Provinicaal Instituut voor Haartooi en Schoonheidszorgen; school for hairdressers and beauticians
S.S.B.O. Reynaertschool
Scholengemeenschap Gent-Zuid
Secundair Kunstinstituut
Sint Pietersinstituut
Sint-Barbaracollege 
Sint-Bavohumaniora
Sint-Janscollege
Sint-Lievenscollege
Sint-Lievenscollege Basisschool 
Sint-Lievenscollege Sint-Pieters-Buiten
Sint-Paulusinstituut
T.I. Tweebruggen
Toren van Babel 
Universiteit Gent
UZ-school stad Gent
Vrije Gesubsidieerde Basisschool

Education in Ghent
Ghent